Zadobrova is a settlement in the City Municipality of Celje in eastern Slovenia. The area is part of the traditional region of Styria. It is now included with the rest of the municipality in the Savinja Statistical Region.

References

External links
Zadobrova on Geopedia

Populated places in the City Municipality of Celje